The AIPLA Quarterly Journal is a law journal covering intellectual property matters that is jointly published by the American Intellectual Property Law Association and the George Washington University Law School. The journal was established in 1972 and is student-edited.

References

External links
 

American law journals
George Washington University Law School
Law journals edited by students
Quarterly journals
Intellectual property law journals
Publications established in 1972
English-language journals
Academic journals published by learned and professional societies